T S Narayanaswami College of Arts and Science is a co-educational institution of higher learning affiliated to the University of Madras and founded by The India Cements Educational Society.

The institute, offering both under-graduate and post graduate degree courses, is situated in a picturesque campus at Navalur, off Old Mahabalipuram Road, in Chennai, Tamil Nadu, India.

History
The India Cements Limited (ICL), one of India's largest cement companies, has promoted liberal education in arts, cultural, science, technology and sports. ICL has been running educational institutions like Bala Vidyalayas and Higher Secondary Schools at Sankarnagar, Sankagiri, Dalavoi, Chilamkur and Yerraguntla (A.P) and a Polytechnic at Sankarnagar, helping a nearly 7000 strong student community during the past four decades.

With a view to extend its vista in the area of higher education, ICL established a society by name The India Cements Educational Society (Regd.) in 1994. To begin with, the agency promoted this self-financed co-educational college of arts and science in memory of the founder of ICL, Shri T S Narayanaswami, during the academic year 1996–97. Sanction from the Government of Tamil Nadu (G.O.No. 488 dt. 25.7.96) and affiliation from the University of Madras were obtained for running the college from the academic year 1996–97.

Courses offered
Under-graduation courses (3 years duration)

B.Sc Computer Science (Bachelor's degree in computer science)
B.Sc Biochemistry (Bachelor's degree in biochemistry)
B.C.A (Bachelor's degree in computer applications)
B.Com (Bachelor's degree in commerce)
B.B.A (Bachelor's degree in business administration)

Post graduation courses (2 years duration)

M.Sc IT (Master's degree''' in Information Technology)
M.Sc Biochemistry (Master's degree in biochemistry)
M.Com (Master's degree in commerce)

Integrated courses (5 years duration)
M.Sc Computer Science and Technology (Master's degree in computer science and technology)

External links
T S Narayanaswami College website

Arts and Science colleges in Chennai
Colleges affiliated to University of Madras